Steen Tinning (born 7 October 1962) is a Danish professional golfer who formerly played on the European Tour and plays on the European Senior Tour.

Career
Tinning was born in Copenhagen. After a successful amateur career he turned professional in 1985 and soon won a place on the European Tour. This career was interrupted when he and his wife were involved in a multiple car crash in Germany in 1990, which badly damaged his right arm. He recovered and went on to win two European Tour events, the 2000 Celtic Manor Resort Wales Open and the 2002 Telefonica Open de Madrid. His last season on the European Tour was 2003, and his best year-end ranking on the Order of Merit was 30th in 2000. He represented his country in international team competitions several times.

In 2013 Tinning won twice on the European Senior Tour, his rookie season on that tour. In August he captured his maiden victory at the Berenberg Masters. In October he won the English Senior Open.

Amateur wins (2)
1983 Danish Amateur Close Championship
1984 Scandinavian Open Amateur Championship

Professional wins (5)

European Tour wins (2)

Nordic Golf League wins (1)

European Senior Tour wins (2)

Results in major championships

Note: Tinning only played in The Open Championship.

CUT = missed the half-way cut
"T" = tied

Results in World Golf Championships

"T" = Tied

Team appearances
Amateur
European Youths' Team Championship (representing Denmark): 1978,  1979,  1981
Jacques Léglise Trophy (representing the Continent of Europe): 1978 (winners), 1979, 1980
Eisenhower Trophy (representing Denmark): 1982, 1984
European Amateur Team Championship (representing Denmark): 1983

Professional
World Cup (representing Denmark): 1987, 1988, 1989, 1990, 1993, 1994, 1995
Dunhill Cup (representing Denmark): 1988

References

External links

Danish male golfers
European Tour golfers
European Senior Tour golfers
PGA Tour Champions golfers
Sportspeople from Copenhagen
1962 births
Living people